Le Chant des chemins de fer (The Song of the Railways) is a cantata in B minor by Hector Berlioz for tenor solo, choir and orchestra composed in June 1846 on lyrics by Jules Janin and premiered June 14 1846 for the inauguration of the gare de Lille.

Circumstances of the composition 
The work was commissioned by the city of Lille. According to his correspondence, Berlioz composed it in a hurry in three nights, interrupting the writing of La Damnation de Faust.

Berlioz, who travelled on the inaugural train, spent eight days in Lille and conducted Le Chant des chemins de fer and at the same time the finale of his Grande symphonie funèbre et triomphale leading a military orchestra of 150 wind instrumentalists and singers from the Conservatoire de Lille.

Berlioz had asked that the final chord be punctuated by a cannonade that could not take place.

Lyrics 
The text is by Jules Janin, a friend of Berlioz and Saint-Simonian. Berlioz supposedly had been enthusiastic at that time about Saint-Simonianism.

Music 
The music is nervous and vigorous, the orchestration bouncing. The cantata also includes a prayer, .

The whole may sound grandiloquent and heavy. The interpretation of the three verses and chorus takes about 9 minutes.

Legacy 
The work was incorporated with other compositions under Opus 19 No. 3, Album leaf. It is rarely played. One of the performances is that of the symphony orchestra of the SNCF with the choirs of the Oratory on the occasion of a Congress of the "Association internationale du congrès des chemins de fer" (AICCF) in 1966.

The work was performed for the opening ceremony of Lille 2004 "European Capital of Culture".

References

External links 
 Chant des chemins de fer on IMSLP
 Jean Dupouy sings Le Chant des Chemins de Fer YouTube

Cantatas
1846 songs
Compositions by Hector Berlioz